An automated personal assistant or an Intelligent Personal Assistant is a mobile software agent that can perform tasks, or services, on behalf of an individual based on a combination of user input, location awareness, and the ability to access information from a variety of online sources (such as weather conditions, traffic congestion, news, stock prices, user schedules, retail prices, etc.).

There are two types of automated personal assistants: intelligent automated assistants (for example, Apple’s Siri and Tronton’s Cluzee), which perform concierge-type tasks (e.g., making dinner reservations, purchasing event tickets, making travel arrangements) or provide information based on voice input or commands; and smart personal agents, which automatically perform management or data-handling tasks based on online information and events often without user initiation or interaction.  As automated personal assistants become more popular, there are increasing legal risks involved.

Both types of automated personal assistant technology are enabled by the combination of mobile computing devices, application programming interfaces (APIs), and the proliferation of mobile apps.  However, intelligent automated assistants are designed to perform specific, one-off tasks specified by user voice instructions, while smart personal agents perform ongoing tasks (e.g., schedule management) autonomously.

See also
Intelligent agent
Intelligent personal assistant
Software agent

References 

Agent-based software